John Travers Wood (November 25, 1878 – November 2, 1954) was an American physician and politician who served as a one-term congressman from northern Idaho.

Early life and education
Born in Wakefield, West Yorkshire, Wood immigrated with his parents to the United States in 1889. They settled in Woodridge, North Dakota, and he became a naturalized a citizen in 1901. After graduating public schools there, he taught school for six years. He then graduated from Detroit College of Medicine.

Career
After graduating from medical school, Wood moved to Hannah, North Dakota, where he operated a medical practice before moving west to Coeur d'Alene, Idaho.

From 1910 to 1950, he worked as a surgeon for the Chicago, Milwaukee & St. Paul Railroad. In addition, he served as the mayor of Coeur d'Alene during 1911 and 1912, and founded the town's hospital. During World War I, he served as a first lieutenant in the medical corps of the U.S. Army.

In the 1950 election, Wood ran as a Republican for the open seat in Congress from Idaho's first district. He took office at age 72 and served a single term, narrowly losing his re-election bid in 1952 to Gracie Pfost. During his term, he also mentioned his distrust of the United Nations, citing its charter's similarities to the Soviet Union's constitution, and mentioned as much to the U.S. Flag Committee.

Personal life
Wood left the House in January 1953 and returned to Coeur d'Alene, where he died less than two years later.

Election results

Source:

References

External links

1878 births
1954 deaths
Politicians from Wakefield
Physicians from Idaho
American surgeons
English emigrants to the United States
Wayne State University alumni
Mayors of places in Idaho
People from Cavalier County, North Dakota
People from Coeur d'Alene, Idaho
United States Army personnel of World War I
Wayne State University School of Medicine alumni
Republican Party members of the United States House of Representatives from Idaho
People with acquired American citizenship